Claudio Maselli (born September 21, 1950) is an Italian professional former footballer and manager.

Career

Footballer

As a footballer, he played several seasons in Serie A for Genoa and Bologna.

Coach

As a coach, he initially managed Genoa youth team, occasionally training even the first team in Serie A and B. Later he followed several clubs in Serie C and Serie D; between 2004 and 2006 he trained Naftex, in Bulgaria. In 2000, he won a promotion in Serie C1 with Alessandria.

References

1950 births
Living people
Footballers from Rome
Italian footballers
Serie A players
Serie B players
Italian football managers
Serie A managers
Genoa C.F.C. players
Bologna F.C. 1909 players
Brescia Calcio players
A.C. Monza players
Genoa C.F.C. managers
U.S. Alessandria Calcio 1912 managers
Rimini F.C. 1912 managers
U.S. Cremonese managers
Association football midfielders